Raphael Schäfer (Polish: Rafał Szafarczyk; born 30 January 1979) is a German former professional footballer who played as a goalkeeper.

Biography

Early years
Raphael Schäfer was born in 1979 as a member of the German minority in the Upper Silesian town of Kędzierzyn-Koźle and in 1986 with his father emigrated from Poland as Aussiedler to settle in northern Germany. Raphael Schäfer learned German in a few months. Schäfer began his footballing career at SC Drispenstedt in a suburb of Hildesheim. At the age of 12 he was scouted by Hannover 96 and joined the ranks of their youth teams. He became part of the first-team squad with 17 but never made it into the starting line-up.

Thus, he decided to join Regionalliga side VfB Lübeck before the 1998–99 season. At Lübeck he quickly became the first-choice goalkeeper but his team failed to qualify for the 2. Bundesliga in three consecutive seasons.

1. FC Nürnberg

Schäfer transferred to 1. FC Nürnberg in July 2001. The club had just been promoted to the Bundesliga and he became the second choice goalkeeper behind former German Under-21-international Darius Kampa. When Kampa had a series of weak showings for the team, coach Klaus Augenthaler gave Schäfer the chance to shine in his first Bundesliga game against Borussia Mönchengladbach in March 2002. Despite playing a good game, Schäfer still remained as second choice as Augenthaler still considered Kampa his first choice keeper. When the club was relegated the following year, Schäfer had played three games for the Franconian side.

At the start of the 2003–04 season, Nürnberg were plagued by financial trouble and looking to cash in on several players including Kampa. Manager Wolfgang Wolf appointed Schäfer as the first choice goalkeeper as he expected Kampa to leave the club before August 2003. However, Kampa was not sold but Schäfer remained the number one goalkeeper. He stayed in this position throughout the entire season despite substantial fan backing for his rival, Kampa.

Even after Kampa was sold to Mönchengladbach before the 2004–05 season, which saw Nürnberg back in the top flight, Schäfer still had to fight off skepticism in his abilities from parts of the Nürnberg supporters. He answered his critics by showing substantial improvements throughout the following two seasons and was voted skipper of the Nürnberg team before the start of the 2006–07 season.

VfB Stuttgart
In July 2007, he moved to Nürnberg's Bundesliga rival VfB Stuttgart, making his debut for them on 10 August against Schalke 04. However, his performances were not as they were expected to be and he could not live up to the expectations. In summer 2008, he was replaced by Jens Lehmann as Stuttgart's number one keeper.

Return to Nürnberg
In summer 2008, Schäfer returned to 1. FC Nürnberg and immediately became number one keeper again.

Honours
1. FC Nürnberg
 DFB-Pokal: 2006–07
 Promotions to the Bundesliga in 2003–04 and 2008–09

References

External links
 

1979 births
Living people
German footballers
Hannover 96 players
VfB Lübeck players
1. FC Nürnberg players
VfB Stuttgart players
People from Kędzierzyn-Koźle
Polish emigrants to Germany
German people of Polish descent
Polish people of German descent
Silesian-German people
Citizens of Germany through descent
Bundesliga players
2. Bundesliga players
Association football goalkeepers